The Cruel Truth is a 1927 silent film drama distributed by the Sterling Pictures company, on a State's Rights concept. It was directed by Phil Rosen and stars Hedda Hopper and Constance Howard. The film is a low budget survivor of the silent era as a print is held by the Library of Congress and the BFI National Film and Television Archive, London.

Cast
Hedda Hopper as Grace Sturdevant
Constance Howard as Helen Sturdevant
Hugh Allan as Reggie Copeley
Frances Raymond as Mrs. Copeley
Ruth Handforth as Maid

References

External links

1927 films
American silent feature films
Films directed by Phil Rosen
1927 drama films
Silent American drama films
American black-and-white films
1920s American films
1920s English-language films